Ronald or Ron Barnes may refer to:
Ronald Barnes, 3rd Baron Gorell (1884–1963), British peer, Liberal politician, poet, author and newspaper editor
Ronald Barnes (carillonist) (1927–1997), American carillonist
Ronald Barnes (tennis) (1941–2002), Brazilian tennis player
Ron Barnes (footballer) (1936–1991), English footballer
Ron Barnes (umpire) (born 1958), American former baseball umpire